Eric Sall is an artist from South Dakota.

Education
Sall attended the Yale Summer Program in 1998, graduated from the Kansas City Art Institute in 1999 with a Bachelor of Fine Arts degree. He continued his education at Virginia Commonwealth University, and graduated with a Master of Fine Arts in 2006.

Awards
Sall has received a Joan Mitchell Foundation Grant and a Virginia Museum of Fine Arts Fellowship.

Exhibitions
He has exhibited in shows including The Triumph of Painting at the Saatchi Gallery in London, The RAIR Paintings at Roswell Museum and Art Center and From The Root To The Fruit at Alona Kagan Gallery in New York. He is represented by ATM Gallery in New York City, Dolphin Gallery in Kansas City and ADA Gallery in Richmond.

His work is held in the collections of the Daum Museum of Contemporary Art, Sedalia, Missouri. and Nerman Museum of Contemporary Art, Overland Park, Kansas,

Art reviews
Sall's art exhibits have been reviewed by Kansas City arts magazine The Pitch, the Seattle Times, and the Village Voice.

References

External links
Sall – ADA Gallery
Eric Sall – Painting – Saatchi Gallery
Eric Sall on ArtFacts.net
ATM Gallery
Eric Sall - Painting - Dolphin Gallery
Charlotte Street Foundation - Eric Sall

American artists
People from South Dakota
Living people
Kansas City Art Institute alumni
Year of birth missing (living people)